This is a list of some of the military equipment used by the Islamic State (IS).

Small arms

Assault and battle rifles

Sniper rifles and anti-material rifles

Machine guns

Shotguns

Pistols

Explosives, anti-tank weapons, grenade launchers, and anti-aircraft launchers

Towed arms

Towed artillery

Vehicles

Logistics and utility vehicles

Tanks and armored fighting vehicles

Self-propelled artillery

Aircraft

Watercraft

ISIL has been using a mix of watercraft to transport fighters around the Tigris River and Euphrates River and has been referred to as their unofficial riverine navy. US forces have come across small watercraft that can ply rivers to carry troops, equipment and in some cases act as floating IEDs.

 Barges for transport.
 Skiffs.
 Motorized vessels.

Weapons production

IS has an indigenous weapons industry. Their workshops can produce identical copies of the RPG-7 and SPG-9. In addition, they have developed an indigenous rocket launcher, which comes in four varieties. Two variants fire PG-9 munitions at short and long range. A third fires PG-7V munitions and the fourth fires an unspecified thermobaric munition. They also produce grenades to be fired from the muzzle of an AK pattern rifle or dropped from a drone. They also produce mortar ammunition and rockets.

See also 
 List of military equipment of Hezbollah
 List of military equipment used by Syrian Democratic Forces
 List of military equipment used by Syrian opposition forces

References

Islamic State of Iraq and the Levant
Islamic State of Iraq and the Levant